Journey is a children's wordless picture book written and illustrated by Aaron Becker. The book was published in 2013 by Candlewick Press. It was selected as a Caldecott Honor Book in 2014.

Through pictures alone, the book tells the story of a lonely girl who uses a red crayon to escape from a mundane world into a magical adventure full of fun and exhilarating adventures. The girl travels on a magic carpet and  boat, gets trapped by an evil tyrant, and must find a way to escape along with a purple bird.  

Journey is the first of a trilogy. The other books are Quest (2014) and Return (2016).

Reception and awards 
The book was well reviewed, receiving a starred review from Kirkus Reviews and Publishers Weekly.

References

External links 

 Elizabeth Bird's review
 Interview with Baker

2013 children's books
American picture books
Caldecott Honor-winning works
Wordless books